The 19th World Festival of Youth and Students (WFYS) was opened on October 14, 2017 in Sochi, Russia. The festival attracted 20,000 people from 180 countries. The opening ceremony of the Festival was held in the arena of the Bolshoy Ice Dome in Sochi. The official slogan of the festival is "For peace, solidarity and social justice, we are fighting against imperialism - respecting our past, we are building our future!". This was the third World Festival of Youth and Students to be held on Russian territory, with the 6th being held in Moscow in 1957, and the 12th festival in 1985.

Russian President Vladimir Putin attended the All-Russian Youth Educational Forum criticizing the coverage of the festival saying that "it is necessary to avoid politicizing the festival and devote it to young people".

See also 
 World Festival of Youth and Students
 World Federation of Democratic Youth

References 

World Festival of Youth and Students
21st century in Sochi
2017 in Russia
2017 festivals
Festivals in Russia
2017 in multi-sport events
Sports festivals in Russia